Officium may refer to:

Religion 
Officium Divinum (or Divinum Officium), the official set of daily prayers prescribed by the Roman Catholic Church
Sanctum Officium, the department in the Roman Curia which oversaw Catholic doctrine

Music 
Officium Defunctorum, a musical setting of the Office of the Dead, composed by the Spanish Renaissance composer Tomás Luis de Victoria in 1603
Officium (album), a 1994 album by Norwegian saxophonist Jan Garbarek, featuring the Hilliard Ensemble
Officium Triste, a doom metal band from Rotterdam, The Netherlands

Other uses 
Officium (Ancient Rome), a Latin word with various meanings, including "service", "(sense of) duty", "courtesy", and "ceremony"